Herbert Paul (born 11 February 1994) is a German professional footballer who last played as a defender for Austrian Bundesliga club Austria Klagenfurt.

Career statistics

Club

References

External links
 
 Profile at FuPa.net

1994 births
Living people
Sportspeople from Ingolstadt
Footballers from Bavaria
German footballers
Germany youth international footballers
Association football defenders
SpVgg Greuther Fürth II players
FC Bayern Munich II players
1. FC Schweinfurt 05 players
TSV 1860 Munich players
SK Austria Klagenfurt players
3. Liga players
Regionalliga players
2. Liga (Austria) players
Austrian Football Bundesliga players